The Karl Marx Theatre is a theatre in Havana, Cuba. It was originally known as the Teatro Blanquita, owned and built by Alfredo Hornedo, renamed to the Teatro Charles Chaplin following the Cuban Revolution of 1959, and finally received its current name in 1975.

The venue has an auditorium, with seating capacity of 5,500 people, and is used for shows by stars from Cuba and abroad.
In 1956, Liberace appeared on stage as part of his first international tour.

See also
Rosita De Hornedo
Alfredo Hornedo

References

Address
Ave 1ª, entre 8 y 10, 
Miramar, Playa, Havana, 
11300

Theatres in Havana
Karl Marx
Buildings and structures completed in 1949
Theatres completed in 1949
Music venues completed in 1949
20th-century architecture in Cuba